Plužina   is a village in the municipality of Svrljig, Serbia. According to the 2002 census, the village has a population of 370 people.

References

Populated places in Nišava District